Red Scare Industries (sometimes referred to as Red Scare Records) is a punk rock record label. The label was started in San Francisco (but moved to Chicago) by former Fat Wreck Chords employee Toby Jeg.

Jeg started the label in 2004 when his friend Brendan Kelly of The Lawrence Arms wanted a new label to release the EP for his new band The Falcon, it has since released material for bands such as The Lillingtons, Cobra Skulls, The Copyrights, Sundowner, Teenage Bottlerocket, and more. For 2010 and 2011, Red Scare albums by The Menzingers and The Sidekicks have been named album of the year by punknews.org.

The label has also worked with non-Red Scare artists on additional projects, including "Red Oktoberfest", an annual weekend music festival in Chicago which has featured bands such as The Lawrence Arms, American Steel, and Off With Their Heads, and the Swingin' Utters tribute album, Untitled 21: A Juvenile Tribute to the Swingin' Utters, which most notably featured the Dropkick Murphys.

Artists

Current artists
Arms Aloft
Brendan Kelly 
The Brokedowns
Bullets To Broadway
The Copyrights
Direct Hit
Druglords Of The Avenues
Elway
The Falcon
 Heart & Lung
The Heat Tape
The Holy Mess
The Isotopes
Joe McMahon
 Laura Jane Grace
Nothington
No Trigger
Reaganomics
 SACK
Sam Russo
 Tightwire
The Sidekicks
Vultures United

Former artists
The Bombpops (active with Fat Wreck Chords)
Cobra Skulls (active with Fat Wreck Chords)
Enemy You (disbanded)
La Plebe (active with Koolarrow Records)
The Lillingtons (disbanded)
Masked Intruder (active with Pure Noise Records)
The Methadones (disbanded)
The Menzingers (active with Epitaph Records)
The Riptides (America only) (active with Asian Man Records)
Sicko (disbanded) 
Sincere Engineer (active with Hopeless Records)
Sundowner (active with Fat Wreck Chords)
Teenage Bottlerocket (active with Rise Records)

References

 
American independent record labels
Punk record labels